Russell Sincock (born 28 December 1947) is an Australian former cricketer. He played two first-class cricket matches for Victoria in 1969.

See also
 List of Victoria first-class cricketers

References

External links
 

1947 births
Living people
Australian cricketers
Victoria cricketers
Cricketers from Melbourne